Sorribas is one of 24 parishes (administrative divisions) in Piloña, a municipality within the province and autonomous community of Asturias, in northern Spain.

The population is 130 (INE 2011).

Villages and hamlets
 Cua 
 Sorribas
 Ardavin (Ardabín)
 Brez 
 El Cotal 
 La Espilonga 
 La Ferrera 
 Los Riegos 
 El Robledal 
 Sabilde 
 Solapeña de Sorribas

References

Parishes in Piloña